The Secretary General of the Council of Europe is elected by the Parliamentary Assembly from a shortlist proposed by the Committee of Ministers for a term of five years.

The secretary general is entrusted with the responsibility of meeting the aim for which the Council of Europe was set up in London on 5 May 1949, namely to achieve greater unity between its Member States for the purpose of safeguarding and realising the ideals and principles which are their common heritage and facilitating their economic and social progress.

Although the Secretary General's powers are not clearly defined, in practice the holder has overall responsibility for the strategic management of the Council of Europe's work programme and budget and oversees the day-to-day running of the Organisation and Secretariat.

Secretaries General

Controversy around 2009 election 
On 12 May 2009 the Committee of Ministers informed the Parliamentary Assembly that there would be only two candidates for the post of Secretary General: Thorbjørn Jagland (former prime minister of Norway) and Włodzimierz Cimoszewicz (former Prime Minister of Poland), thus rejecting a Belgian appeal to add two more people to the list of the candidates. Coincidentally, both candidates were Prime Ministers at the same time (1996–1997) and both are social democrats. On 23 June the Council of Europe Parliamentary Assembly decided to postpone the election at least until its September session, thus leaving the chair empty from 1 September 2009.

The Parliamentary Assembly was angered by the decision of the Committee of Ministers to remove two of the four candidates from the shortlist: Belgian senator Luc Van den Brande and Hungarian parliamentarian Mátyás Eörsi, who are both members of the Parliamentary Assembly. On 11 September 2009, reporting on the election controversy, Le Monde reported that the future Secretary General would inherit an institution that was in crisis.

On 30 September 2009 Thorbjørn Jagland was elected as secretary-general. On 24 June 2014 he was re-elected to a second, five-year term to start on 1 October 2014.

2019 election 
Four member states proposed candidates by 10 January 2019, who were then considered by the Committee of Ministers. Among them, the two who were selected to progress to be voted on by the Parliamentary Assembly were Belgium's foreign minister Didier Reynders and Croatia's foreign minister Marija Pejčinović Burić. Pejčinvoić Burić was elected by a margin of 54 votes and will take office on 15 October 2019.

Nominated for consideration by the Committee of Ministers:
 
 Didier Reynders (Belgium)
 Andrius Kubilius (Lithuania)
 Dora Bakoyannis (Greece)
 Marija Pejčinović Burić (Croatia)

Selected by the Committee to be voted on by the Parliamentary Assembly: 

The Parliamentary Assembly voted on the candidates on 26 June 2019

Marija Pejčinović Burić: 159 votes
Didier Reynders: 105 votes

References

External links
The Council of Europe Secretary General

Council of Europe